Azor Matusiwa (born 28 April 1998) is a Dutch professional footballer who plays as a defensive midfielder for French club Reims.

Club career

Ajax
Matusiwa made his professional debut in the Eerste Divisie for Jong Ajax on 21 November 2016 in a game against Jong FC Utrecht.

On 6 May 2018, Matusiwa made his debut in the first team of Ajax, on the final matchday of the Eredivisie against Excelsior.

Reims
On 31 August 2021, he signed a five-year contract with French Ligue 1 club Reims.

Personal life
He is the brother of Diangi Matusiwa.

Honours
Jong Ajax
 Eerste Divisie: 2017-18

References

External links
 

Living people
1998 births
Dutch people of Angolan descent
Sportspeople from Hilversum
Dutch footballers
Footballers from North Holland
Association football midfielders
Netherlands under-21 international footballers
Netherlands youth international footballers
AFC Ajax players
De Graafschap players
FC Groningen players
Jong Ajax players
Stade de Reims players
Eerste Divisie players
Eredivisie players
Ligue 1 players
Dutch expatriate footballers
Dutch expatriate sportspeople in France
Expatriate footballers in France